Derek O'Reilly is a hurler for Dublin and Craobh Chiaráin. Derek won a Dublin Senior Hurling Championship medal with Craobh Chiaráin in 2006. O'Reilly scored a (0-2f) in the final against Ballyboden in a game that finished with the score 2-10 to 2-8. O'Reilly was named on the Dublin Blue Stars team for 2006 at right half back.

References

Year of birth missing (living people)
Living people
Dublin inter-county hurlers
Craobh Chiaráin hurlers